In typography, a counter is the area of a letter that is entirely or partially enclosed by a letter form or a symbol (the counter-space/the hole of). The stroke that creates such a space is known as a "bowl". Latin letters containing closed counters include A, B, D, O, P, Q, R, a, b, d, e, g, o, p, and q. Latin letters containing open counters include c, f, h, s etc. The digits 0, 4, 6, 8, and 9 also possess a counter. An aperture is the opening between an open counter and the outside of the letter.

The lowercase 'g' has two typographic variants: the single-storey 'g' has one closed counter and one open counter (and hence one aperture); the double-storey '' has two closed counters.

The digit '4' also has two typographic variants: the closed-top variant '4' has a closed counter, and an open-top (e.g. handwritten) '' has an open counter.

Open and closed apertures
Different typeface styles have different tendencies to use open or more closed apertures. This design decision is particularly important for sans-serif typefaces, which can have very wide strokes making the apertures very narrow indeed.

Fonts designed for legibility often have very open apertures, keeping the strokes widely separated from one another to reduce ambiguity. This may be especially important in situations such as signs to be viewed at a distance, materials intended to be viewed by people with vision problems, or small print, especially on poor-quality paper. Fonts with open apertures include Lucida Grande, Trebuchet MS, Corbel and Droid Sans, all designed for use on low-resolution displays, and Frutiger, FF Meta and others designed for print use. This design trend has become increasingly common with the spread of humanist sans-serif designs since the 1980s and the 1990s and the use of computers requiring new fonts which are legible on-screen.

Grotesque or neo-grotesque sans-serif fonts like Helvetica use very closed apertures, folding up stroke ends to make them closer together. This gives these designs a distinctive, compact appearance, but may make similar letterforms hard to distinguish. Closed letterforms on highly condensed grotesque designs such as Impact and Haettenschweiler make characters such as 8 and 9 almost indistinguishable at small print sizes. Designer Nick Shinn has suggested that the cause of this design trend, similar to the Didone serif typefaces of the nineteenth century, may have been the desire to distribute the pressure of the printing press on the type, reducing wear.

See also 
 Figure space
 Thin space
 Paren space
 Counterpunch (typography)

References

Typography
Whitespace